The historiography of the War of 1812 reflects numerous interpretations of the conflict, especially in reference to the war's outcome, since it ended in a stalemate. The historical record has interpreted both the British and Americans as victors in the conflict, with substantial academic and popular literature published to support each claim. The British, who were able to concurrently defeat Napoleon Bonaparte twice and end the Napoleonic Wars, viewed the War of 1812 as a minor theatre that was overshadowed by key victories at the Battle of Trafalgar in 1805 and the Battle of Waterloo in 1815, leading to the Pax Britannica. In the United States and Upper Canada, nationalistic mythology around the war took hold following its conclusion. Canadians affirmed their ability to remain separate from the United States. With the failure of the invasion of British Canada advancing the concept of Canadian identity, and of Canada as a distinct region that would continue to evolve into a nation. Americans were able to end the impressment of their citizens and enforce their sovereignty. Both the restoration of honor and what has been called the Second War of Independence are important themes in American historiography, and are considered significant results by historians. Indigenous nations are generally held to have lost in the war.

Popular views 
Both Americans and Canadians widely believed that their own countries had won the war. Each young country saw its self-perceived victory and settling of the border between them as an important foundation of its growing nationhood. The British, preoccupied with Napoleon's challenge in Europe, paid little attention to what was to them a peripheral and secondary dispute. 

One interpretation, especially in Canada, is that of a British or Canadian win and an American defeat. Another leading interpretation, held mainly in the United States, is that of an American win. In a 2012 interview at The Christian Science Monitor, Donald R. Hickey said: "By my count, we lost the War of 1812 and we lost Vietnam. That's not a widely held opinion in the United States about the War of 1812. The common view is that the war ended in a draw." According to Claire Turenner Solander, "Canadians are unified (because we participated in our diversity in the war under the British Crown, which is our real heritage) and we are distinct from the United States (because we won, and because we are British)." According to Troy Bickham, the American victory at New Orleans "did not have an impact on the war's outcome", but it shaped "how the Americans received the end of the war by creating the illusion of military victory."

American views 
While American popular memory includes the British capture and the August 1814 burning of Washington, which necessitated extensive renovation, it focused on the victories at Baltimore, Plattsburgh, and New Orleans to present the war as a successful effort to assert American national honor, or a Second War of Independence, in which the mighty British Empire was humbled and humiliated. In keeping with this sentiment, there is a popularly held view that Britain had planned to annex Louisiana in 1815. The amoral depravity of the British, in contrast with the wholesome behavior of the Americans, has the "beauty and booty" story at the center of any account of Jackson's victory at New Orleans. In a speech before the U.S. Congress on 18 February 1815, the then U.S. president James Madison proclaimed the war a complete American victory.

This interpretation of the war was and remains the dominant American view of the war. The American newspaper Niles' Register announced in an editorial on 14 September 1816 that the Americans had crushed the British, declaring "we did virtually dictate the treaty of Ghent to the British." A minority of Americans, mostly associated with the Federalist Party, considered the war a defeat and an act of folly on Madison's part, caustically asking why the British Crown did not cede British North America to the United States if the Americans were dictating the terms of the Treaty of Ghent. The Federalist view of the war is not the mainstream American memory of the war. Congressman George Troup, who said in a speech in 1815 that the Treaty of Ghent was "the glorious termination of the most glorious war ever waged by any people", expressed American popular opinion and memory of the war.

Americans also celebrated the successful American defense of Fort McHenry in September 1814, which inspired the lyrics of what was adopted as the United States national anthem, called The Star-Spangled Banner. Captains of the United States Navy became popular heroes, and commemorative plates were produced with the likenesses of Stephen Decatur, Isaac Hull, and Charles Stewart on them, becoming popular items. Many of these plates were manufactured in England. The navy became a cherished institution, lauded for the victories that it won against all odds. After engagements during the final actions of the war, the United States Marines had acquired a reputation as marksmen, especially in ship-to-ship actions.

Canadian views 

In Upper Canada, the War of 1812 was seen by Loyalists as a victory since they had successfully defended their country from an American takeover. A consequence of the Canadian militias' successes was the view, Canada did not need a regular professional army. While Canadian militias had played instrumental roles in several engagements, it was the regular units of the British Army, that ensured the successful defense of Canada.

The United States Army had made several attempts to invade Canada and the Canadians had defended their territory. The British did not doubt that the thinly populated territory would remain vulnerable in another war. In 1817, Admiral David Milne wrote to a correspondent: "We cannot keep Canada if the Americans declare war against us again." The Rideau Canal was later built for just such a scenario.

By the 21st century, it was a forgotten war in Britain, although still remembered in Canada, especially Ontario. In a 2009 poll, 37% of Canadians said the war was a Canadian victory, 9% said the United States won, 15% called it a draw and 39% said they knew too little to comment. A 2012 poll found that in a list of items that could be used to define Canadians' identity, the belief that Canada successfully repelled an American invasion in the War of 1812 places second (25%).

Historians' views 
Militarily historians hold the view that the war ended in a draw or stalemate The Treaty of Ghent closing a war that had become militarily inconclusive. Neither side wanted to continue fighting since the main causes had disappeared and since there were no large lost territories for one side or the other to reclaim by force. Historians conclude that all three nations were "the real winners" of the War of 1812. Historians also add that the war could have been avoided in the first place by better diplomacy. The war is seen as a mistake for everyone concerned because it was badly planned and marked by multiple failures on both sides, especially as shown by the repeated American failures to seize parts of Canada and the failed British attack on New Orleans and upstate New York.

Historians disagree on who won the War of 1812 and have debated its outcome for nearly two centuries. While most historians reach the middle position that it was a draw, there are differing and complex interpretations of the war. A survey of school textbooks found that historians emphasize different aspects of the war according to their national narratives, with some British texts scarcely mentioning the war. According to Donald R. Hickey, a popular interpretation is that "everyone was happy with the outcome. Americans were happy because they thought they had won: Canadians were happy because they knew they had won; and the British were happiest of all because they quickly forgot about the war. ... For the British, in other words, the return to status quo ante Bellum as a triumph, for it had demonstrated that they could defeat Napoleonic France in Europe while still fending off U.S. aggression in North America." Historians who believe that both sides won argue that their main objectives were achieved as Britain defeated Napoleon and ruled the seas while the United States restored its independence and honor and opened the way to westward expansion. While historians like Wesley Turner held that both sides won, another interpretation held by those like Henry Adams came close to suggesting that both sides lost.

British Empire 
Historians who hold that the war constituted a British victory and an American defeat argue that the British achieved their military objectives in 1812 by stopping the repeated American invasions of Canada and retaining their Canadian colonies. In contrast, the Americans suffered a defeat when their armies failed to achieve their war goal of seizing part or all of Canada. Additionally, they argue the United States lost as it failed to stop impressment which the British refused to repeal until the end of the Napoleonic Wars, arguing that the American actions had no effect on the Orders in Council which were rescinded before the war started. While acknowledging that the war is "usually seen as a draw", Brian Arthur argues that "it was in fact a British victory" because "the British achieved success through an effective commercial maritime blockade which had devastating consequences on the vulnerable, undeveloped US economy." Troy Bickham, author of The Weight of Vengeance: The United States, the British Empire, and the War of 1812, sees the British as having fought to a much stronger position than the United States.

According to Carl Benn, "[t]he main objective of keeping Canada had been met as of 1814", while "Americans realized that their own objectives in going to war could not be achieved, and thought the best they could probably get was the preservation of the status quo that they had been fighting so hard to upset." According to Andrew Lambert, "Americans began to rewrite the war as a victory, exploiting the ambiguity of the diplomatic settlement achieved in the Treaty of Ghent on 24 December 1814, a status quo ante compromise that did not reflect the depth of America's defeat." For Jon Latimer, "Britain was content to settle for the 1812 status quo, and that is what Britain got. The United States, in contrast, achieved none of its war aims, and in these terms, the War of 1812 must be seen as a British victory, however marginal." Bickham considers that the British offered the United States generous terms in place of their initially harsh terms, which included massive forfeiture of land to Canada and the Native Americans, because the "reigning Liverpool ministry in Britain held a loose grip on power and feared the war-weary, tax-exhausted public." For Bickham, the war was also technically a British victory "because the United States failed to achieve the aims listed in its declaration of war."

G. M. Trevelyan evaluated the war in negative terms for Britain. He stressed the long-term damage to what has been called the Special Relationship between Britain and the United States, and wrote: "The self-defense of the two Canadas against invasion, and the historical traditions that the infant nation thus acquired were an important result of the war. Otherwise, it had been fought in vain. It solved none of the disputed questions out of which it arose." According to Trevelyan, "the anti-British tradition had obtained a fresh lease of life in the United States, whose orators now had the theme of a second war against Britain as the second romantic period of their national history. The Tory Cabinet cannot be praised for the management of affairs that led to this breach of the peace."

United States 
Historians who believe that it was an American success argue that the main motivation was restoring the nation's honor in the face of relentless British aggression toward American neutral rights on the high seas and in the Western lands. According to Norman K. Risjord, the results in terms of honor satisfied the War Hawks. Donald R. Hickey writes: "Did the cost in blood and treasure justify the U.S. decision to go to war? Most Republicans thought it did. In the beginning, they called the contest a 'second war of independence', and while Britain's maritime practices never truly threatened the Republic's independence, the war did in a broad sense vindicate U.S. sovereignty. But it ended in a draw on the battlefield." Historians argue that it was an American success to end the threat of indigenous nations' raids, kill the British plan for a semi-independent Native American sanctuary, and hereby to open an unimpeded path for westward expansion. Winston Churchill commented: "The lessons of the war were taken to heart. Anti-American feeling in Great Britain ran high for several years, but the United States was never again refused proper treatment as an independent power." George C. Daughan argues that the United States achieved enough of its war goals to claim a victorious result of the conflict and subsequent impact it had on the negotiations in Ghent. Daughan uses official correspondences from James Madison to the delegates at Ghent strictly prohibiting negotiations with regards to maritime law.

For Daughan, the British permanently stopped impressing Americans, although they never publicly rescinded the possibility of resuming that practice. The American delegates at the meeting understood it to be a dead issue after the 1814 surrender of Napoleon. In addition, the successful defense of Baltimore, Plattsburgh and Fort Erie (a strategic fortress located in Upper Canada on the Niagara River and occupied during the third and most successful offensive into Canada) had a very favorable influence on the negotiations for the Americans and prompted several famous responses from both sides. Henry Clay wrote to the delegates in October 1814, "for in our own country, my dear sir, at last, must we conquer the peace." With growing pressure in Britain, Arthur Wellesley, 1st Duke of Wellington, when asked to command the forces in the United States, wrote to Robert Jenkinson, 2nd Earl of Liverpool, on 9 November 1814: "I confess that I think you have no right, from the state of the war, to demand any concession of territory from America. ... You have not been able to carry [the war] ... into the enemy's territory, notwithstanding your military success and now undoubted military superiority, and have not even cleared your own territory on the point of attack [at Fort Erie]. ... Why stipulate for uti possidetis?" Daughan argues that the argument the United States failure to capture any Canadian territory influenced the negotiations is an outdated and highly criticized position. He cites the Edinburgh Review, a British newspaper, that had remained silent about the war with the United States for two years, writing that "the British government had embarked on a war of conquest after the American government had dropped its maritime demands, and the British had lost. It was folly to attempt to invade and conquer the United States. To do so would result in the same tragedy as the first war against them, and with the same result."

Canada 
The militia myth of Canadian victory was created by the reactionary elites of Upper Canada, such as the Family Compact, long after the war ended. Most people in Upper Canada were late Loyalists, namely economic migrants from the United States, the United Empire Loyalists were not a distinct group, about 10% of the Loyalists were former slaves, and most residents did not care who won the war and did not participate in it. The Family Compact disenfranchised most residents of Upper Canada after the war, with the idea of loyalty being used to justify the suppression of dissent. According to historians, such as David Mills, the myth was invented for immigrants who arrived after the end of the Napoleonic Wars. American spelling, which had been standard in the province, was rejected in favor of British spelling, and the local population began to call themselves Canadians. The milita myth of Canada being able to defend itself without a standing army came to be thought of politically as a fact.

Indigenous nations 
Historians generally agree that the real losers of the War of 1812 were the indigenous nations. Tecumseh's Confederacy, which had joined the British side, was defeated and its leader, Tecumseh, killed in battle. Donald R. Hickey wrote: "The big losers in the war were the Indians. As a proportion of their population, they had suffered the heaviest casualties. Worse, they were left without any reliable European allies in North America. ... The crushing defeats at the Thames and Horseshoe Bend left them at the mercy of the Americans, hastening their confinement to reservations and the decline of their traditional way of life."

The indigenous nations of the Old Northwest (the modern Midwest) had hoped to create an indigenous state as a British protectorate. American settlers into the Midwest had been repeatedly blocked and threatened by indigenous raids before 1812, and that now came to an end. Throughout the war, the British had played on the terror of the Fs and scalping knives of their indigenous allies as it worked especially at William Hull's surrender at Detroit. By 1813, Americans had killed Tecumseh and broken his coalition of tribes. Andrew Jackson then defeated the Creeks in the Southwest. Historian John Sugden says that in both theaters, the indigenous nations' strength had been broken prior to the arrival of the major British forces in 1814. The one campaign that the Americans had decisively won was the campaign in the Old Northwest, which put the British in a weak hand to insist upon an indigenous nations' state in the Old Northwest.

Notwithstanding sympathy and support from commanders, such as Isaac Brock, Alexander Cochrane and Edward Nicolls, the policymakers in London reneged on this promise as making peace had a higher priority for the politicians. At the peace conference, the British demanded an independent indigenous state in the Midwest. Although the British and their indigenous allies maintained control over the territories in question (i.e. most of the Upper Midwest), British diplomats did not press the demand after an American refusal, effectively abandoning their allies. The withdrawal of British protection gave the Americans a free hand that resulted in the removal of most of the tribes to Indian Territory (present-day Oklahoma). According to historian Alan Taylor, the final victory at New Orleans had in that sense "enduring and massive consequences". It gave the Americans "continental predominance", while it left the indigenous nations dispossessed, powerless, and vulnerable.

The Treaty of Ghent technically required the United States to cease hostilities and "forthwith to restore to such Tribes or Nations respectively all possessions, rights, and privileges which they may have enjoyed, or been entitled to in 1811." The United States ignored this article of the treaty and proceeded to expand into this territory regardless. Meanwhile, Britain was unwilling to provoke a further war to enforce it. A shocked Henry Goulburn, one of the British negotiators at Ghent, remarked: "Till I came here, I had no idea of the fixed determination which there is in the heart of every American to extirpate the Indians and appropriate their territory."

The Creek War came to an end, with the Treaty of Fort Jackson being imposed upon the indigenous nations. About half of the Creek territory was ceded to the United States, with no payment made to the Creeks. This was in theory invalidated by Article 9 of the Treaty of Ghent. The British failed to press the issue and did not take up the indigenous cause as an infringement of an international treaty. Without this support, the indigenous nations' lack of power was apparent and the stage was set for further incursions of territory by the United States in subsequent decades.

Notes

References

Bibliography 

 
 
 
 
 
 
 
 
 
 
 
 
 
 
 
 
 
 
 
 
 
 
 
 
 
 
 
 
 
 
 
 
 
 
 
 
 
 
 
 
 
 
 
 
 
 
 
 
 
 
 

Historiography of the United States
Historiography of the United Kingdom
Historiography of Canada
War of 1812
War of 1812